A kitchen maid or kitchen girl is a young housemaid, or other junior female domestic worker.

Description
In the hierarchy of a great house, the kitchen maid ranked below a cook and above a scullery maid. An experienced kitchen maid is an assistant cook; the position may be compared to that of a chef de partie in a professional kitchen.

An early meaning of "slut" was "kitchen maid or drudge" (c. 1450), a meaning retained as late as the 18th century. 

In the 19th century a colloquial version was "kitching-maid".

Known kitchen maids
 Margaret Powell worked as a kitchen girl at the age of 15.

References

Maid
 Kit
Domestic work